Alanson Holly (July 21, 1810September 15, 1882) was an American newspaper editor and Republican politician.  He served one term in the Wisconsin State Assembly, representing western Columbia County.

Biography
Born in Granville, New York, Holly taught school and was in the mercantile and newspaper business in Wyoming County, New York. In 1855, Holly settled in Kilbourn City, Wisconsin, Holly started the newspaper the Wisconsin Mirror in 1856. In 1860, Holly shut down the newspaper and moved to Lockport, New York. In 1866, Holly returned to Kilbourn City and restarted the newspaper. In 1868, Holly served in the Wisconsin State Assembly. Holly died in Kilbourn City, Wisconsin.

Notes

External links

1810 births
1882 deaths
People from Granville, New York
Politicians from Lockport, New York
People from Wisconsin Dells, Wisconsin
Editors of Wisconsin newspapers
Educators from New York (state)
Members of the Wisconsin State Assembly
19th-century American politicians
Journalists from New York (state)
19th-century American educators